Abdali Hospital is a multi-specialty hospital located in the modern development of Al-Abdali, Amman, Jordan. The hospital was founded by the investment group behind the Clemenceau Medical Center in Beirut, which is affiliated with Johns Hopkins Medical Center in Baltimore, Maryland. The hospital treats numerous health conditions and receives grants for medical laboratory services. Abdali Hospital opened on 1 July 2019 and began receiving patients in early September 2019.

Architecture and construction 
Its layout was designed by Dar Al Omran Planning, Architecture, Engineering to have efficient patient inflow and outflow, staff circulation, and segregation of inpatient and outpatient traffic.

The hospital has a capacity of 206 general medical and surgical beds across nine floors. It also has three floors for specialty centers and seventeen for general outpatient clinics. Additionally, the hospital has three floors dedicated for administration and two for staff conferences and training. There is underground parking for the hospital with a total of 720 parking spaces.

The hospital has ground access to the Boulevard, the Abdali Mall, and nearby hotels. It overlooks the older section of Al-Abdali, with views of buildings that are representative of Jordanian culture, such as the King Abdullah l mosque.

The entire building is powered by an 8.2 megawatt photovoltaic power plant which the largest solar array in the world to power a single healthcare facility.

Construction incidents 
On 7 July 2018, a mobile crane was in the process of dismantling one of the two tower cranes that was finished working on the hospital. A mechanical failure caused the mobile crane to collapse along with the tower crane it was dismantling. The accident caused four injuries, damaged two vehicles, and damages solar panels on the roof of the nearby House of Representatives. There was no damage to Abdali Hospital. After the incident, 

the Greater Amman Municipality declared that it had certified a few days earlier that the mobile crane was safe to use.

Facilities 
Abdali Hospital provides care to patients in numerous specialties. Apart from its general surgery section, it has specialists in orthopedics and rheumatology, gynecology, urology and endocrinology, neurology, nephrology, pulmonology, internal medicine, oncology, infectious disease, and anesthesiology. The hospital also offers aesthetic specialties including plastic surgery and dermatology. Finally, there is a women's health center with a specialty in breast cancer.

The emergency room department is equipped with private examination rooms for general treatment. It also has a resuscitation unit and minor operation procedural unit. The department is located on the ground floor and has a separate entrance to facilitate emergency transport to the emergency room and improve patient flow.

At the time of its construction, Abdali Hospital adopted state of the art medical IT systems which allowed electronic medical records to be integrated in the documentation of the medical conditions and treatments of patients.

In total, the hospital has ten operating rooms, four endoscopy suites, three catheterization labs, eight dialysis units, 200 hospital beds with twenty intensive care units, the capacity for over 150 clinics, and a conference center that includes an auditorium. 

Abdali Hospital provides care to patients in numerous specialties. Apart from its general surgery section, it has specialists in:

 Orthopedic and Rheumatology
 Obstetrics And Gynecology
 Urology
 Endocrinology
 Cardiovascular Care
 Neurology and Neurosurgery
 Plastic Surgery, Dermatology and Aesthetic
 Ear, Nose and Throat (ENT)
 General and Bariatric Surgery
 Endocrinology
 Hematology and Oncology
 Ophthalmology
 Pulmonary and Critical Care Medicine
 Vascular Surgery
 Nephrology
 Internal Medicine
 Infectious Disease
 Anesthesiology and Pain Management
 Breast and Women’s Health Care
 Pediatric Medicine and Neonatology
 Gastroenterology and Hepatology

References

Hospitals in Amman
Buildings and structures under construction in Jordan